Ramotswa is a village in South-East District of Botswana, southwest of the capital of Gaborone. The population was 27,760 in 2011 census.
It is the tribal capital of the BaLete, an ethnic majority springing from the Nguni tribe.

Ramotswa's main industry is a wheat flour mill. The village also manufactures metal products.

Kgosi Mosadi Seboko of Ramotswa is the first woman to serve as a paramount chief in Botswana.  Seboko took on her role as a village leader and representative to the House of Chiefs after her brother Kgosi Seboko II died in 2000.  Her presence in the house of chiefs was hailed as a victory for women's rights in southern Africa.

The nearby hamlet of Otse is the site for Moeding College, originally a colonial secondary school and a school for the disabled run by the Campbill Rankoromane Community educational center. Police XI, Botswana Premier League champions for 2006, are also based in Otse.

The climate is semi-arid, vegetation is a tree and shrub savanna. Only a fifth of the area is farmed but the density of cattle and goats and sheep is high.

Otse is overlooked by cliffs from which a colony of vultures are easily visible on most days.

On the outskirts of village lies Mothubakwane ward, where a prominent figure Tlotlo Oepeng lives. Other notable places include Siga ward, home to Killer Giants the local football club, Lesetlhana ward housing the central business district and Taung village where the industry lies.

Notable natives and residents

 Mosadi Seboko, Motswana chief of the Balete people in Botswana
 Donald Thobega, football player
 Ofentse Nato, football player

References

"Botswana: First female paramount chief welcomed" (September 3, 2003), IRINnews.org

Populated places in Botswana
South-East District (Botswana)
Botswana–South Africa border crossings